The 2016–17 Utah State Aggies men's basketball team represented Utah State University in the 2016–17 NCAA Division I men's basketball season. This was head coach Tim Duryea's second season at Utah State. The Aggies played their home games at the Dee Glen Smith Spectrum in Logan, Utah as members of the Mountain West Conference. They finished the season 14–17, 7–11 in Mountain West play to finish in tie for eighth place. They defeated San Jose State in the first round of the Mountain West tournament to advance to the quarterfinals where they lost to Nevada.

Previous season
The Aggies finished the 2015–16 season 16–15, 7–11 in Mountain West play to finish in a tie for eighth place. They defeated Wyoming to advance to the quarterfinals of the Mountain West tournament where they lost to San Diego State.

Departures

Incoming Transfers

Recruiting

Roster

Schedule and results

|-
!colspan=9 style=| Exhibition

|-
!colspan=9 style=| Non-conference regular season

|-
!colspan=9 style=| Mountain West regular season

|-
!colspan=9 style=| Mountain West tournament

References 

Utah State Aggies
Utah State Aggies men's basketball seasons
Aggies
Aggies